Badenoch (from , meaning "drowned land") is a traditional district which today forms part of Badenoch and Strathspey, an area of Highland Council, in Scotland, bounded on the north by the Monadhliath Mountains, on the east by the Cairngorms and Braemar, on the south by Atholl and the Grampians, and on the west by Lochaber. The capital of Badenoch is Kingussie.

Geography
Excepting the strath of the Spey and the great glens, it consists almost entirely of wild mountainous country, many hills exceeding  in height, and contains in the forests of Alder, Drumochter, Gaick and Feshie some of the best deer country in the Highlands.

The principal lochs in Badenoch are Loch Laggan, Loch Insh and Loch Ericht, and the River Spey and its numerous tributaries water the district abundantly. The Highland railway traverses Badenoch from Dalnaspidal to Boat of Garten.

In modern times Badenoch comprises the parishes of Alvie, Kingussie and Insh, and Laggan. The former Lordship of Badenoch also included a detached portion in the east, the parish of Kincardine, now part of Abernethy and Kincardine parish. As regards the parish of Duthil and Rothiemurchus, the barony of Glencarnie in Duthil (from Aviemore to Garten) was attached for a time. Rothiemurchus, which lies between Badenoch and its former detached portion, was never a part of Badenoch.

Population

The population of Badenoch at the last census (2011) was as follows:

The Picts inhabited Badenoch, as shown by the placenames which include Pictish prefixes such as Pet (Pitowrie, Pictchim, Pitmean) and Aber (Aberarder), not occurring in Gaelic.
However their language was superseded by Gaelic in 11th century and even as late as 1881 74% of Badenoch was Gaelic speaking (2,685 out of the population of 3,611).

History
From 1229 to 1313 Clan Comyn held the lordship of Badenoch. In 1371 King Robert II granted it to his son Alexander Stewart, 1st earl of Buchan (1343–1405), the "Wolf of Badenoch" or "" ('Great Alexander, son of the king'). Reverting to the crown, the territory came in 1452 to Alexander Gordon, 1st Earl of Huntly, and still gives the title of "Lord of Badenoch" to the marquess of Huntly.

The traditional district was eventually combined into the traditional county of Inverness-shire along with the traditional district of Inverness, parts of Lochaber and some island districts during reorganisation due to the Local Government (Scotland) Act 1889. This Act established a uniform system of county councils and town councils in Scotland and restructured many of Scotland's counties. (See: History of local government in the United Kingdom.)

Economy
The area has very few industries, and the population groups itself at Kingussie and at other places on or near the Spey.

Notes and references

Bibliography
 
 

Geography of Highland (council area)